Tom McMurchy (born December 2, 1963) is a Canadian former professional ice hockey winger. He played 55 games in the National Hockey League for the Chicago Black Hawks and the Edmonton Oilers between 1983 and 1987. The rest of his career, which lasted from 1983 to 1993, was mainly spent in the minor leagues.

Career statistics

Regular season and playoffs

External links
 

1963 births
Living people
Bellingham Blazers players
Brandon Wheat Kings players
Canadian ice hockey left wingers
Chicago Blackhawks draft picks
Chicago Blackhawks players
EHC Bülach players
Edmonton Oilers players
Halifax Citadels players
HC Fiemme Cavalese players
Ice hockey people from British Columbia
Medicine Hat Tigers players
Milwaukee Admirals (IHL) players
Moncton Golden Flames players
Nova Scotia Oilers players
SG Cortina players
Sportspeople from New Westminster
Springfield Indians players